
Year 330 (CCCXXX) was a common year starting on Thursday (link will display the full calendar) of the Julian calendar. At the time, it was known as the Year of the Consulship of Gallicanus and Tullianus (or, less frequently, year 1083 Ab urbe condita). The denomination 330 for this year has been used since the early medieval period, when the Anno Domini calendar era became the prevalent method in Europe for naming years.

Events 
 By place 
 Roman Empire 
 May 11 – Emperor Constantine the Great dedicates the Column of Constantine and Constantinople, or Nova Roma (modern-day Istanbul). He had spent four years expanding the city of Byzantium, having chosen the site for its strategic location on the Bosporus. The city is later the capital of the Eastern Roman Empire.
 The Goths devastate the city of Tanais, in the Don River Delta.

 Africa 
 Ezana, king of Axum, extends his area of control to the west. He defeats the Nobates, and destroys the kingdom of Meroë.

 By topic 
 Religion 
 Frumentius is the first bishop of Ethiopia (approximate date).
 Eustathius, Patriarch of Antioch, is banished to Trajanopolis.
 The Bible is translated into the Gothic language by Wulfila.
 Pagan temples begin to be progressively abandoned, destroyed or left to fall into disrepair, save those that are transformed into churches.

Births 
 Basil the Great, bishop of Caesarea Mazaca (d. 379)
 Macrina the Younger, Christian nun and saint (d. 379)
 Moses the Black, Christian monk and priest (d. 405)
 Victricius of Rouen, Christian missionary and bishop 
 Yang Xi, Chinese scholar and calligrapher (d. 386)

Deaths 

 Achillius of Larissa (or Achilles), Greek bishop 
 Arnobius, Numidian apologist and writer
 Guo Mo, Chinese general and warlord
 Helena (Augusta), mother of Constantine I
 Tiridates III (the Great), king of Armenia
 Vicinius of Sarsina, Christian bishop 
 Zu Yue, Chinese general and warlord

References